"The Dorcons" is the twenty-fourth episode of the second season of Space: 1999 (and the forty-eighth and final overall episode of the programme).  The screenplay was written by Johnny Byrne; the director was Tom Clegg.  Original titles were "Last of the Psychons" and "Return of the Dorcons".  The final shooting script is dated 17 November 1976.  Live-action filming took place Tuesday 7 December 1976 through Thursday 23 December 1976.

Story 
It is 2,409 days after leaving Earth orbit, and Moonbase Alpha is tracking an unidentified powered object following the Moon.  Sensors detect no life forms and the craft is emitting an energy field highly sensitive to matter.  The Alphans conclude the object to be a robot survey device.  The object continues to close, the energy field making contact with the Moon surface.  The instruments suddenly register a tremendous energy surge.  As John Koenig orders defensive measures, the object projects a ray at Alpha that not only penetrates the defence screens but underground into Command Centre.

As the light-beam appears in the room, all personnel are immobilised, with the exception of Maya.  The ray's first action is to short-out the Main Computer input terminal.  It then roams the room, briefly pausing on each person's face.  When it encounters Maya, it focuses on her and the Psychon woman experiences horrible pain.  With an agonised shriek, she collapses.  Its goal achieved, the light disappears and the others are released from their paralysis.

As attempts to contact the inert survey device fail, technicians examining Computer discover damage to its data-bank. Helena Russell tends to the unconscious Maya; her preliminary diagnosis is shock due to neurological trauma.  To everyone's relief, Maya soon comes to.  She tells them the ray was a mind-probe; after singling her out, it intensified and almost tore her mind apart.  Concerned, Koenig questions the doctor about the possibility of brain damage.

Sensors detect activity from the alien object—it is losing molecular cohesion, transforming into a gaseous mass of raw matter.  As they watch, the mass expands and solidifies, becoming an impressive spacecraft.  Maya is terrified at the sight of it, sobbing that the light was a Dorcon probe and that the ship is after her.  She explains the Dorcons are the most powerful race in this galaxy and her people's most feared enemy.  A scan of the vessel reveals a meson converter, a power system that can convert matter to energy, restructure it into any form and shift it through space instantaneously.

Maya is right, aboard the Dorcon capital ship, a heated discussion over the best means to catch the Psychon is under way.  In the presence of the Imperial Archon, supreme ruler of the Federated Worlds of Dorcon, His Excellency Malic—the Archon's unstable nephew and heir apparent—proposes an armed invasion of the alien base to capture her.  The Archon's chief advisor, Consul Varda, disagrees, arguing the Psychon might be killed in such a campaign.  Knowing Maya's death would suit his ambitious nephew's desire to ascend to the throne, the Archon supports Varda's recommendation to employ diplomatic methods.

Maya relates that, with their technology, the Dorcons can control of all the forces of nature except death.  They have hunted her people for centuries as, through Psychons, they can achieve immortality.  Her tale is interrupted by a signal from the Dorcon ship. It is Varda, presenting her credentials; Koenig is angered by the attack on Maya and the Dorcon woman offers a gracious apology.  Varda officially requests, in the name of the Imperial Archon, that Maya be delivered into her custody.  Koenig declines but a hysterical Maya warns him "Resistance is futile". Varda's final words are to heed the Psychon—Koenig may be willing to die for his principles but is everyone on Alpha equally inclined?

Alpha is at red alert; combat Eagles rise on the launch pads, laser batteries are deployed, non-combatants move to underground shelters and security forces guard the airlock stations.  As they wait, Koenig asks Maya to explain how her people provide Dorcons with immortality.  She informs him Dorcons do not die in the manner of most humanoid races: their brain-stems cease to function at an advanced age.  They discovered Psychons possess brain-stems with regenerative properties that can last forever.  If a Psychon brain-stem is surgically grafted to a Dorcon brain, the result is virtual immortality.

On the Dorcon ship, Malic and Varda bicker over her failure.  Outraged, the Archon silences them, then orders Varda to obtain the Psychon at any cost.  The Dorcon crew selects targets for the assault and with reluctance, Varda gives the order to fire.  A fusillade of energy bolts lay waste to perimeter buildings of the Alpha installation.  Alpha's main batteries return fire but the laser beams bounce off the Dorcon ship's hull.  The next Dorcon volley destroys the gun emplacements.  Alan Carter's combat Eagle group lifts-off and converges on the alien battleship.  Their weapons are also ineffective and they withdraw, though not before Eagle Four is picked off by Dorcon fire.

As the bombardment continues, two hysterical operatives demand Koenig turn over Maya, one threatening him with a stun-gun.  The man is disarmed but a desperate Maya pleads with Helena to use the weapon to kill her—if taken, the surgery will leave her nothing more than a living husk.  The doctor briefly considers euthanising Maya but is unable to fire and passes the gun to Koenig.  Pressing it to Maya's temple, he contacts Varda.  Unless the attack is cancelled immediately, he will kill the last of the Psychons.  Varda cannot risk calling his bluff and ceases fire.

Moving fast, the Dorcons activate the meson converter.  Varda and her personal guard transport into Command Centre.  When the Dorcon stormtroopers effortlessly subdue all resistance, Koenig is forced to surrender.  Maya is nowhere in sight (having disguised herself in the form of a co-worker) and Varda resorts to using the mind-probe ray to flush her out.  They take the metamorph into custody and depart.  Koenig leaps into the active transporter beam, arrives on the ship and is stunned on sight.  The Archon is on hand to congratulate Varda on the success of her mission.  He orders Maya taken to the medical unit, where she is placed under a paralysing beam while the Imperial surgeon prepares for the brain-stem transfer.

The Archon orders Koenig killed but a guilty Varda persuades the ruler to spare his life.  As the Archon withdraws, the Commander is secured in a force-field until the meson converter's antimatter coils recharge; the attack has temporarily drained its power.  Malic approaches Varda with a sly proposal: allow his uncle to die and when he is named Archon, she may have anything she desires.  The Consul's reply is blunt.  The Archon fosters peace and stability, while Malic's ambitions will plunge the empire into war and misery.  Now that Malic has shown his treasonous intent, she bars him from the Archon's presence.

Returning to the operations area, she finds Koenig conscious and hostile.  Varda reasons the security of thousands of worlds outweighs the life of one Psychon.  He asks if this justification is for his benefit—or her own?  The medical officer interrupts, stating she is ready for surgery.  Varda leaves, ordering Koenig be transported when the converter is recharged.  He resists and makes a break for the door—to be stopped by an armed Malic.  Koenig is amazed when the Dorcon aristocrat shoots his own men, more so when he allows the Commander to go free.  Once Koenig is out of sight, the scheming youth raises the alarm.

Unaware of this intrigue, Varda escorts the Archon to the surgical transfer unit.  Looking down at Maya, he reflects on who is the greater victim: she, destined to living death or he to eternal life.  Unfamiliar with the layout of the vast Dorcon ship, Koenig has difficulty evading the stormtroopers.  When the Commander is cornered, Malic again appears to shoot his own soldier.  Koenig is suspicious but Malic taunts him with Maya's impending fate and directs him to the surgical area.  Malic contacts Varda, telling her the escaped alien commander has gone berserk, killing soldiers in his search for her.  Varda leaves the Archon unattended to lead the hunt for Koenig as Malic planned.

Koenig's trail is soon picked up by Varda and her troops.  When trapped in a blind alley with pursuers just around the corner, he pulls open a grille and hides in a ventilation duct.  He realises the ducts will make travelling easier and he crawls off in search of Maya.  Malic enters the surgical unit and shoots the medical officer.  After waking his uncle to gloat on the end of his reign, he activates a surgical instrument that projects an intense energy beam on the Archon's forehead.  The sociopathic youth enjoys watching his uncle beg for mercy as the beam slowly fries his brain.

After the Archon expires, Malic releases Maya from her paralysis (intending to hide her until he can make use of her himself).  Just then, Koenig jumps out of the air vent; in a scuffle, Maya transforms into a lizard beast to subdue Malic.  After they leave in search of the transporter, the Dorcon heir recovers and announces the death of the Archon.  As the new Archon, he orders the human murderer to be killed on sight—but his Psychon accomplice must be captured alive.  He removes the badge of office from his uncle and places the medallion around his own neck, mocking the corpse with a sarcastic salute.

Arriving at the operations room, the Alphans are confronted by a vengeful Varda.  She pledges to kill them and everyone on Alpha for their heinous crime.  Malic enters to observe the execution.  Koenig identifies the real murderer—the new Archon, who decoyed Varda away so he could assassinate their leader.  As the truth dawns on Varda, Malic orders the Consul placed under arrest.  An enraged Varda attacks the youth, who shoots her.  Her dying move is to fire her own weapon at the meson converter, intentionally damaging the magnetic shield to expose the antimatter coils.

With the ship disintegrating around them, the Alphans jump into the transporter beam and return home.  The insane Malic hysterically shouts for the converter to obey its Archon as the ship blows apart with a blast that seems to set space itself ablaze.  On Alpha, repairs are well in hand and all casualties off the critical list.  Resting after their ordeal, Koenig reflects that, all things considered, Consul Varda was quite a woman. Helena suggests taking care of Koenig's bandaged hands, and he asks if they should do that in his quarters or hers.  She seductively says "medical center" and the two share a gentle laugh. Tony Verdeschi jokingly asks Maya if there is anything else in her Psychon past they should know about.  With an air of mock pretension, she replies that is a highly improper question to ask any lady.

Cast

Starring 
 Martin Landau — Commander John Koenig
 Barbara Bain — Doctor Helena Russell

Also Starring 
 Catherine Schell — Maya

Featuring 
 Tony Anholt — Tony Verdeschi
 Nick Tate — Captain Alan Carter

Guest Stars 
 Patrick Troughton — The Archon
 Ann Firbank — Consul Varda
 Gerry Sundquist — Malic

Also Featuring 
 Alibe Parsons — Alibe
 Laurence Harrington — Stewart
 Kevin Sheehan — Dorcon Operative
 Michael Halsey — First Dorcon Soldier
 Hamish Patrick — Command Centre Operative
 Hazel McBride — Dorcon Medical Officer

Uncredited Artists 
 Maxwell Craig — Airlock Security Guard
 Peter Brayham — Corridor Security Guard
 Jenny Cresswell — Maya/Woman Operative
 Roy Scammell — Maya/Creature

Music 

The score was re-edited from previous Space: 1999 incidental music tracks composed for the second season by Derek Wadsworth and draws primarily from the scores of "The Metamorph" and "Space Warp".

Production Notes 

 The episode carried the working title "Return of the Dorcons" on a shooting script dated 19 October 1976.  With much of the same scene structure and dialogue, several differences exist:  (1) The script notes the title 'Archon' should be pronounced the same as 'march on' to avoid confusion with the episode title "The Mark of Archanon"; (2) Helena is relegated to the underground shelters with her patients before the attack and is not seen until the epilogue; (3) Maya transforms into a potted plant to hide from Varda and threatens to shoot herself with Verdeschi's gun when outed.  Koenig talks her out of committing suicide; (4) A different epilogue was scripted where the six regular characters relax in Koenig's quarters.  The question of her Psychon past caused Maya to recollect an encounter with a handsome Psychon boy during a holiday to her planet's Southern Flora Region.  Jealous, Verdeschi sweeps her off her feet and out of the room.  When left alone, Koenig and Helena reflect that 'What's in the past has gone...fate has played us some strange hands but we've won through in the end.  As for the future...that starts right here and now,' and would close the scene with a kiss.  (This seems to acknowledge the staff's awareness this would be the programme's final installment.)
 Many of the changes from the above version of the script would be motivated by the budgetary restrictions of this being the series' last episode.  Scenes set in Medical Centre and Koenig's quarters would take place in Command Centre in the re-write.  The scene showing Helena in an underground shelter was cut.  Carter would have been shown coordinating Bill Fraser and the Eagle attack force on the Dorcon ship from Command; in the final draft, Fraser went unmentioned, and Carter himself was seen via TV monitor in the pilot's seat, leading the strike.  The Dorcon vessel's sets were constructed out of pre-existing flats and set-dressings from previous episodes.  Attentive viewers would recognise actor Laurence Harrington (playing Stewart) from his previous role as Tom Jackson in "Journey to Where".
 This installment would fulfill first-season script editor Johnny Byrne's three-script commitment to producer Fred Freiberger.  After seeing his scripts "The Biological Soul" and "The Face of Eden" (later "The Metamorph" and "The Immunity Syndrome") extensively re-worked (for the worse by his reckoning) for new series format, he gave the man a 'Freddie Freiberger/Johnny Byrne' action adventure story which would revolve around Maya, but done in such a way she would be rendered helpless.  Tired of Maya being used to get out of every perilous situation, he created a race that hunted Psychons—as they would be able to control them.
 Byrne would have preferred Freiberger to use his script "Children of the Gods" as the series finale.  In it, the Alphans are terrorised by a pair of sociopathic children with formidable mental powers.  The children are revealed to be their distant descendants, brought back in time by an alien race.  The aliens have caused these children to be raised alone, without any human contact, to prove that Mankind is inherently amoral.  They intend to destroy Alpha in the present to prevent the birth of these future Alphans.  Koenig then must prove Mankind's worthiness to survive.

Novelisation 

The episode was adapted in the sixth Year Two Space: 1999 novel The Edge of the Infinite by Michael Butterworth published in 1977.  This novel was not released in the United Kingdom and only as a limited edition in the United States and Germany.  The adaptation was based on the earlier version "Return of the Dorcons".

References

External links 
Space: 1999 - "The Dorcons" - The Catacombs episode guide
Space: 1999 - "The Dorcons" - Moonbase Alpha's Space: 1999 page

1977 British television episodes
Space: 1999 episodes
British television series finales